Marc Roberts may refer to:
 Marc Roberts (singer) (born 1968), Irish singer-songwriter and radio broadcaster
 Marc Roberts (footballer) (born 1990), English footballer
 Marc Roberts (politician), member of the Utah House of Representatives
 Marc Roberts (sports agent) (born 1959), basketball player and sports agent
 Marc Roberts, health policy analyst, see health care reform

See also  
 Mark Roberts (disambiguation)